Placidochromis subocularis is a species of cichlid endemic to Lake Malawi and Lake Malombe where it is found where sandy and rocky zones meet or over sandy substrates at depths of from .  It feeds on aquatic invertebrates including snails.  This species can reach a length of  TL.  It can also be found in the aquarium trade.

References

subocularis
Taxa named by Albert Günther
Fish described in 1894
Taxonomy articles created by Polbot
Taxobox binomials not recognized by IUCN